Fleet Football Club (Thai สโมสรฟุตบอลกองเรือรบ), is a Thai football club under the stewardship of Royal Thai Navy based in Sattahip, Chonburi, Thailand. The club is currently playing in the Thai League 3 Eastern region.

History
In early 2022, the club was established and competed in Thailand Amateur League Eastern region, using the Battleship Stadium as the ground and their head coach is Wiriya Phaophan.The club's badge use a frigate that is the HTMS Makut Rajakumarn and 5 patrol crafts including HTMS Ratcharit, HTMS U-domdej, HTMS Soo Pirin, HTMS Chonburi, and HTMS Kantang. At the end of the season, the club could be promoted to the Thai League 3. They use the Battleship Stadium as a ground to compete for the T3 in the 2022–23 season.

In late 2022, Fleet competed in the Thai League 3 for the 2022–23 season. It is their first season in the professional league. The club started the season with a 1–2 away defeat to Chachoengsao Hi-Tek and they ended the season with a 1–0 home win over the Chachoengsao Hi-Tek. The club has finished sixth place in the league of the Eastern region.

Stadium and locations

Season by season record

P = Played
W = Games won
D = Games drawn
L = Games lost
F = Goals for
A = Goals against
Pts = Points
Pos = Final position

QR1 = First Qualifying Round
QR2 = Second Qualifying Round
R1 = Round 1
R2 = Round 2
R3 = Round 3
R4 = Round 4

R5 = Round 5
R6 = Round 6
QF = Quarter-finals
SF = Semi-finals
RU = Runners-up
W = Winners

Players

Current squad

References

External links
 Thai League official website
 Club's info from Thai League official website

Association football clubs established in 2022
Football clubs in Thailand
Chonburi province
2022 establishments in Thailand